"Borderline" is a song by British producer Michael Gray featuring Shelly Poole of Alisha's Attic. It was released in August 2006 as Gray's second single. While "Borderline" failed to match the success of its predecessor, "The Weekend", it entered the top 50 on various record charts, including those of Australia, Germany, Hungary, Ireland, Italy, and the United Kingdom.

Content
The song contains a sample replay of Chapter 8's 1979 R&B hit "Ready for Your Love".

Music video
The music video does not include Michael Gray or Shelly Poole. It features dancer Keeley Malone lying on a sun chair touching another dancer and lipsynching parts of the song - this scene switches back and forth through others which are of female dancers (including Shelina Gallacher among others) on rooftops of buildings in London (St. Paul's Cathedral can be seen at times in the background, and at least one location is believed to be 8-10 New Fetter Ln, EC4). The outfits in the video consist of what looks like; a white schoolgirl top and black tie, a black coat, a black bikini bottom, black stockings and black heels (as seen in the video screenshot). The video has been banned on 3 UK TV channels as a result.  It was directed by Phil Griffin.

Track listings

UK CD single
 "Borderline" (radio edit) – 3:15
 "Borderline" (original mix) – 7:35
 "Borderline" (vocal club mix) – 6:25
 "Borderline" (Dennis Christopher's Vocal Mix) – 7:06
 "Borderline" (Spencer & Hill Mix) – 5:58
 "Borderline" (video)

UK and US digital download
 "Borderline" (radio edit) – 3:15
 "Borderline" (club mix) – 6:09
 "Borderline" (Disciples of Sound Vocal Mix) – 8:28
 "Borderline" (Disciples of Sound dub mix) – 8:27
 "Borderline" (Spencer & Hill Mix) – 5:56
 "Borderline" (Spencer & Hill Dub Mix) – 5:57
 "Borderline" (Michael's Neon Wave Vocal Mix) – 7:10
 "Borderline" (Michael's Neon Wave Dub Mix) – 5:54
 "Borderline" (Dennis Christopher's Vocal Mix) – 7:06
 "Borderline" (Dennis Christopher's Dub Mix) – 6:51
 "Borderline" (Dennis Christopher's Alternative Dub Mix) – 7:06

European CD single
 "Borderline" (radio edit) – 3:15
 "Borderline" (vocal club mix) – 5:54
 "Borderline" (Michael Gray's Neon Wave Vocal Mix) – 7:10
 "Borderline" (Lee "Muddy" Baker Acoustic Mix) – 3:12

Australian CD single
 "Borderline" (radio edit) – 3:15
 "Borderline" (Lee "Muddy" Baker Acoustic Mix) – 3:12
 "Borderline" (Ian Carey Mix) – 6:55
 "Borderline" (original mix) – 7:20
 "Borderline" (vocal club mix) – 6:09
 "Borderline" (Dennis Christopher's Vocal Mix) – 7:05
 "Borderline" (Spencer & Hill Mix) – 5:57

Australian and New Zealand digital download
 "Borderline" (radio edit) – 3:14
 "Borderline" (Lee "Muddy" Baker Acoustic Mix) – 3:11
 "Borderline" (Ian Carey Mix) – 6:54
 "Borderline" – 7:19
 "Borderline" (vocal club mix) – 6:09
 "Borderline" (Dennis Christopher's Vocal Mix) – 7:05
 "Borderline" (Spencer & Hill Mix) – 5:56
 "Borderline" (Neon Wave Vocal Mix) – 7:14
 "Borderline" (Disciples of Sound Vocal Mix) – 8:32
 "Borderline" (Gianluca Motto "Soho" Mix) – 8:27
 "Borderline" (Pain & Rossini Mix) – 6:40

Credits and personnel
 Producer, mixing, keyboards, programming: Michael Gray
 Vocals: Shelly Poole 
 Sample replay: Mark Summers, Scorccio.com
 Bass: James Winchester
 Photography: Luciana
 Photography, Video Director: Phil Griffin
 Recorded at Sultra Studios UK

Charts

Release history

References

2005 songs
2006 singles
Songs written by Shelly Poole
Universal Music Group singles